American Matchmaker, or אמעריקאנער שדכן (Americaner Shadchen) is a 1940 Yiddish-language American comedy film directed by Edgar G. Ulmer and starring Leo Fuchs, Judith Abarbanel, Judel Dubinsky and Anna Guskin. The film has music composed by Sam Morgenstern.

Cast
 Leo Fuchs
 Judith Abarbanel
 Judel Dubinsky
 Anna Guskin
 Celia Brodkin
 Rosetta Bialis
 Abraham Lax
 Esther Adler
 Sarah Krohner

References

External links
 

1940 films
Yiddish-language films
1940 comedy films
Films set in New York (state)
American comedy films
American black-and-white films
1940s English-language films
1940s American films